The Tampico Mexico Temple is the 83rd operating temple of the Church of Jesus Christ of Latter-day Saints (LDS Church).

History
The first LDS Church temple in Mexico was built in Mexico City in 1983. Twenty-three years later, there are twelve LDS Church temples in Mexico. The Tampico Mexico Temple—actually located in Ciudad Madero, part of the Tampico conurbation—was the sixth to be dedicated in the country.

Tampico itself has a population of about 212,000 and is located in the state of Tamaulipas, on the Gulf of Mexico. There are about 18,000 church members in the city. Previous to the temple's dedication, local Latter-day Saints had to cross the Sierra Madre mountain range to reach the temple in Mexico City. A groundbreaking ceremony, which about 930 people attended, was held on 28 November 1998.

Thomas S. Monson, of the LDS Church's First Presidency gave the dedicatory prayer for the Tampico Mexico Temple on May 20, 2000.

In 2020, the Tampico Mexico Temple was closed in response to the coronavirus pandemic.

See also

 Comparison of temples of The Church of Jesus Christ of Latter-day Saints
 List of temples of The Church of Jesus Christ of Latter-day Saints
 List of temples of The Church of Jesus Christ of Latter-day Saints by geographic region
 Temple architecture (Latter-day Saints)
 The Church of Jesus Christ of Latter-day Saints in Mexico

Additional reading

References

External links
Tampico Mexico Temple Official site
Tampico Mexico Temple at ChurchofJesusChristTemples.org

20th-century Latter Day Saint temples
Buildings and structures in Tamaulipas
Temples (LDS Church) completed in 2000
Tampico
Temples (LDS Church) in Mexico
2000 establishments in Mexico